Lukas Grozurek (born 22 December 1991) is an Austrian professional footballer who plays as a left midfielder for First Vienna.

Club career
During the winter break of the 2014–15 season, Grozurek left Rapid Wien and joined nearby Admira Wacker. He signed a contract for 18 months until 2016 including an extension clause for another year.

On 17 September 2020 he signed a one-year contract with an extension option with SKN St. Pölten.

In January 2021, Grozurek signed with Dinamo Batumi from the Georgian highest division.

Career statistics

Club

References

1991 births
Austrian people of Polish descent
Footballers from Vienna
Living people
Association football forwards
Austrian footballers
Austria youth international footballers
Austria under-21 international footballers
Wiener Sport-Club players
SK Rapid Wien players
FC Admira Wacker Mödling players
SK Sturm Graz players
Karlsruher SC players
SKN St. Pölten players
FC Dinamo Batumi players
First Vienna FC players
Austrian Football Bundesliga players
Austrian Regionalliga players
2. Bundesliga players
Erovnuli Liga players
Austrian expatriate footballers
Expatriate footballers in Germany
Austrian expatriate sportspeople in Germany
Expatriate footballers in Georgia (country)
Austrian expatriate sportspeople in Georgia (country)